Jesse C. "Jess" Edwards is an American politician, who is a member of the New Hampshire House of Representatives. He represents the Rockingham 4 district, comprising the towns of Auburn, Chester, and Sandown.

Biography
Edwards served in the United States Medical Corps, reaching the rank of lieutenant colonel and retiring in 2009. While in the Corps, he served as a comptroller to the 18th Medical Command in Korea.

Political career
Edwards is a Republican. In his third term, he was appointed to Chair Division III of the Finance Committee.

Political positions

Abortion
In 2022, Edwards advocated for the successful passage of HB1609 which created an exemption for fatal fetal diagnoses to the 24-week abortion ban law passed in 2021.

Personal life
Edwards' daughter, Elizabeth, served as a state representative, and Edwards credits her service as the inspiration for his run for office.

Electoral history

References 

21st-century American politicians
Living people
Republican Party members of the New Hampshire House of Representatives
People from Auburn, New Hampshire
United States Army Medical Corps officers
Year of birth missing (living people)